
A trace element, also called minor element, is a chemical element whose concentration (or other measure of amount) is very low (a "trace amount"). They are classified into two groups: essential and non-essential. Essential trace elements are needed for many physiological and biochemical processes in both plants and animals. Not only do trace elements play a role in biological processes but they also serve as catalysts  to engage  in oxidation and reduction mechanisms.

The exact definition depends on the field of science:

 In analytical chemistry, a trace element is one whose average concentration is less than 100 parts per million (ppm) measured in the atomic count or less than 100 micrograms per gram.
 In biochemistry, an essential trace element is a dietary element that is needed in very minute quantities for the proper growth, development, and physiology of the organism. The dietary elements or essential trace elements are those that are required to perform vital metabolic activities in organisms. Examples of essential trace elements in animals include Fe (hemoglobin), Cu (respiratory pigments), Co (Vitamin B12), Mn and Zn (enzymes). Some examples within the human body are cobalt, copper, fluorine, iodine, iron, manganese and zinc.  Although they are essential, they become toxic at high concentrations. Elements such as Ag, As, Cd, Cr, Hg, Pb, and Sn have no known biological function, with toxic effects even at low concentration. 
 Structural components of cells and tissues that are required in the diet in gram quantities daily are known as bulk elements.
 In geochemistry, a trace element is one whose concentration is less than 1000 ppm or 0.1% of a rock's composition. The term is used mainly in igneous petrology. Trace elements will be compatible with either a liquid or solid phase. If compatible with a mineral, it will be incorporated into a solid phase (e.g., nickel's compatibility with olivine). If it is incompatible with any existing mineral phase it will remain in the liquid magma phase. The measurement of this ratio is known as the partition coefficient. Trace elements can be substituted for network-forming ions in mineral structures. Trace elements that are not essential to a mineral's defined composition will not appear in the chemical formula of that mineral.

See also 
 Bowen's Kale
 GEOTRACES
 List of micronutrients

References 

Analytical chemistry
Biochemistry
Geochemistry
Nutrition
Physiology